Nicholas of Anjou (July 1448 – 27 July 1473) was the son of John II, Duke of Lorraine and Marie de Bourbon.

Nicholas was born and died in Nancy.  He succeeded his father in 1470 as Duke of Lorraine, and assumed the titles of Marquis of Pont-à-Mousson, Duke of Calabria, and Prince of Girona, as heir apparent of Bar, Naples, and Aragon respectively.

He was engaged to Anne of France, Viscountess of Thouars, and used her title, but he did not marry her and had only one illegitimate daughter, Marguerite, wife of John IV of Chabannes, Count of Dammartin (d. 1503).

Some said he had been poisoned by agents of King Louis XI of France.

On his death the Duchy of Lorraine went to his aunt Yolande.

See also
 Dukes of Lorraine family tree

1448 births
1473 deaths
House of Valois-Anjou
Nicholas 1
Nicholas 1
Marquesses of Pont-à-Mousson
Heirs apparent who never acceded